HMS Springbank was a Royal Navy fighter catapult ship of the Second World War.

Originally a cargo ship built in 1926 for Bank Line it was acquired by the Admiralty at the start of the war and converted to an "auxiliary anti-aircraft cruiser" by the addition of four twin  gun turrets and two quadruple 2 pdr (40 mm) "pom-pom"s.

In March 1941 a catapult for a single Fairey Fulmar naval fighter (from 804 Naval Air Squadron) was fitted midships as a means to give further protection for convoys from enemy aircraft.

Springbank was part of the escort for Convoy HG 73 from Gibraltar to Liverpool. Springbanks Fulmar was launched to drive off a German Focke-Wulf Fw 200 reconnaissance aircraft; the Fulmar landing at Gibraltar afterwards. The convoy was attacked by Italian and German submarines over the following days.

Notes

References
 
 
 
 
 
 

 

World War II naval ships of the United Kingdom
1926 ships
Auxiliary anti-aircraft ships of the Royal Navy
Ships sunk by German submarines in World War II
World War II shipwrecks in the Atlantic Ocean